The Venerable  Henry Walker Yeoman  (b Whitby 21 November 1816; d Marske-by-the-Sea 30 March 1897) was Archdeacon of Cleveland from 1882 until his death.

Yeoman was  educated at  Trinity College, Cambridge;  and ordained in 1840. He was Vicar of Marske-by-the-Sea from 1840 to 1850; and Rector of Moor Monkton from 1850 to 1870.

References

People from Whitby
Alumni of Trinity College, Cambridge
Archdeacons of Cleveland
1816 births
1897 deaths